Fantasy is an urban pop vocal group based in New York City who scored several hits on the Hot Dance Music/Club Play chart, including "You're Too Late", which hit number one in 1981.

Group members included Ken Roberson, Tamm E Hunt, Rufus Jackson and Carolyn Edwards. The group's producer, Tony Valor, continued to use the name in 1985 when they released an Italo disco-influenced single called "He's My Number One".

History
"You're Too Late" was a number-one dance hit in the United States. It had a five-week reign at the top of the Billboard Hot Dance Club Play chart in early 1981. It also reached the top 30 on the Soul Singles chart.

In 1982, the band released a pop-soul number entitled "Hold On Tight", which peaked at number 35 on the Dance Club chart, and #1 on the 1982 Billboard Year End Award followed by "Live the Life I Love", boogie song that had reached number 41 on the same chart by 1983.

Their last successful track titled "He's Number One" reached number 37 on the Dance chart in 1986.

Discography

Studio albums

Singles

See also
List of number-one dance hits (United States)
List of artists who reached number one on the US Dance chart

References

American boogie musicians
American pop music groups
American disco groups
American dance music groups
Epic Records artists
Musical groups from New York (state)